Walter Joel Hernández Ordoñez (born 28 December 1978) is a Honduran football midfielder who currently plays for Platense in the Liga Nacional de Honduras.

Club career
Nicknamed el Zurdo, he started his career at hometown club Platense, before moving abroad to have a short stint in Mexican football with Puebla. He also played for Real España, and Hispano but has played the majority of his career for Olimpia in Tegucigalpa in the Liga Nacional de Honduras.

The left-sided midfielder was released by Olimpia in August 2011 and he joined Atlético Choloma for the 2012 Clausura. He returned to his original team Platense to play in the 2012 Apertura.

International career
Hernández made his debut for Honduras in a November 2002 friendly match against Colombia and has earned a total of 12 caps, scoring 1 goal. He has represented his country at the 2003 CONCACAF Gold Cup.

His final international was a November 2004 FIFA World Cup qualification match against Costa Rica.

International goals
Scores and results list Honduras' goal tally first.

References

External links

 Player profile - Diez 

1978 births
Living people
People from Puerto Cortés
Association football midfielders
Honduran footballers
Honduras international footballers
2003 CONCACAF Gold Cup players
Platense F.C. players
Club Puebla players
Real C.D. España players
C.D. Olimpia players
Hispano players
Atlético Choloma players
Honduran expatriate footballers
Expatriate footballers in Mexico
Liga Nacional de Fútbol Profesional de Honduras players
Liga MX players